Tongiaki are native watercraft of Tonga. They are double-hulled canoes in the Austronesian tradition, similar to catamarans.

See also
outrigger canoe

References

Catamarans
Tongan culture